Progress and Justice Population of Islamic Iran is an Iranian Principlist political party closely associated with Mohammad Bagher Ghalibaf. Established in 2008, Morteza Talaie was formerly the general-secretary and many members hold senior positions in Tehran municipality.

The group launched and operated Mohammad Bagher Ghalibaf's campaign in 2013 Iranian presidential election. 15 out of the 31 members of the City Council of Tehran between 2013 and 2017 were endorsed by the party.

Party leaders

References

2008 establishments in Iran
Political parties established in 2008
Principlist political groups in Iran